The girls' 44 kg competition in taekwondo at the 2014 Summer Youth Olympics in Nanjing took place on August 17. A total of 9 women competed in this event, limited to fighters whose body weight was less than 44 kilograms. Preliminaries started at 14:00 and finals at 19:00. Two bronze medals were awarded at the Taekwondo competitions.

Results

Legend
PTG – Won by points gap
SUD – Won by sudden death (golden point)
SUP – Won by superiority

Main bracket

References

Taekwondo at the 2014 Summer Youth Olympics